Otto Schlicht was a German-American manufacturer of concertinas in Chicago.

Biography
Schlicht arrived in the United States from Germany around 1900, having worked on German-type concertinas there. He applied his knowledge to the production of concertinas, and began producing models under the brand-names Patek, Pearl Queen, and Peerless for music shop in Illinois.

He transitioned to owning his own concertina workshop, where he produced his brands until 1950. Shortly after he ceased working, in 1952 concertina maker Christy Hengel purchased Schilicht's concertina-making equipment, which had been stored in a basement since the workshop closed, for $1500, moving it to his own shop in Minnesota.

References

Concertina makers
American people of German descent
American musical instrument makers